Illulissuaq Peninsula (old spelling: Igdluligssuaq) is a mainland peninsula in northwestern Greenland, located in the northern part of Upernavik Archipelago

History 
The peninsula was inhabited between 1908 and 1973, although not continuously. The Illulik settlement, perched on the western cape of the peninsula, was very small, and consisted of only several families. Illulik was temporarily abandoned for the first time in 1909, due to relative isolation from other settlements of the region in early 20th century. The settlement was repopulated in 1914, and unlike small, insular villages in Inussulik Bay and Sugar Loaf Bay to the south, it survived the post-war consolidation phase in northwestern Greenland. It was permanently abandoned in 1973.

Geography 

The peninsula has an east–west orientation, jutting westwards into Inussulik Bay.

In the south, Illulissuaq Peninsula is separated from Nuussuaq Peninsula by the Kangerluarsuk Fjord, an inlet of Inussulik Bay. The fjord nearly splits the peninsula into two halves, with the western half separated from the nunatak in the east by a low, narrow isthmus. The western half of the peninsula forks into two, with a small rocky child Paattorfik Peninsula, pointing southwestwards and bounding Kangerluarsuk from the northwest.

It is mountainous, culminating in several summits, with the highest reaching  on Paattofrik.

Promontories

References 

Inussulik Bay
Peninsulas of the Upernavik Archipelago